Patricia Norford (born 28 January 1932) is a former Australian fencer. She competed in the women's individual foil event at the 1952 Summer Olympics.

References

1932 births
Living people
Australian female foil fencers
Olympic fencers of Australia
Fencers at the 1952 Summer Olympics
People from Parramatta
Sportspeople from Sydney